Bioanalysis is a biweekly peer-reviewed scientific journal established in 2009 and published by Future Science. The editor-in-chief is Neil Spooner (Spooner Bioanalytical Solutions Ltd, UK). The journal covers the field of bioanalysis, including drug and metabolite assays, chromatography and separation sciences, ligand binding assays, metabolomics, and key detection methods.

Abstracting and indexing 
The journal is abstracted and indexed in BIOSIS Previews, Chemical Abstracts, EMBASE/Excerpta Medica, Index MedicusMEDLINE//PubMed, Science Citation Index Expanded, and Scopus. According to the Journal Citation Reports, the journal has a 2016 impact factor of 2.673, ranking it 33rd out of 77 journals in the category "Biochemical Research Methods" and 26th out of 76 in the category "Chemistry, Analytical".

Awards 
The journal partners with Bioanalysis Zone, an online community website, to run two annual award schemes – the Bioanalysis Young Investigator Award (awarded since 2012) and the Bioanalysis Outstanding Contribution Award (awarded since 2014).

References

External links 
 
 Bioanalysis Zone

Biochemistry journals
English-language journals
Publications established in 2009
Biweekly journals
Future Science Group academic journals